Xuanwumen or Xuanwu Gate may refer to:

Xuanwumen (Beijing) (宣武门), a former gate in southern Beijing that was demolished in 1965
Xuanwu Gate Incident, a coup set in Tang Dynasty in China
Xuanwumen (玄武门), a gate of Xuanwu Lake as part of the City Wall of Nanjing

Historical use
Xuanwu Gate (玄武门), the north gate of Taiji Palace (太极宫), Chang'an (now Xi'an), where Xuanwu Gate Incident took place
Xuanwu Gate (玄武门), the north gate of Daming Palace, Chang'an (now Xi'an)
Shenwu Gate (神武门), formerly "Xuanwu Gate" (玄武门), name changed in Kangxi Emperor era, Gate of Divine Prowess, the north gate of Forbidden City, Beijing
Xuanwu Gate (玄武门), The north gate of Ming Palace, Nanjing

See also
Xuanwumen Station (disambiguation)